The Nebraska–Texas football rivalry was an American college football rivalry between the Nebraska Cornhuskers and Texas Longhorns.

History
The rivalry dissolved when Nebraska left the Big 12 Conference for the Big Ten Conference. Due to Colorado, Missouri, Nebraska, and Texas A&M leaving the conference, the Big 12 Championship Game dissolved due to a lack of teams in the conference. The last Big 12 Championship game was played between Nebraska and Oklahoma in 2010.

The rivalry is known for the tension between the two programs. Almost every game between the two could have gone either way, with Texas winning many of the victories in heartbreaking fashion. In the 1996 Big 12 Championship game, Nebraska had a four-point lead over Texas until Wane McGarity scored a touchdown for Texas, followed by a late touchdown by Priest Holmes to allow Texas to win, 37–27.

The 2009 Big 12 Championship Game between Texas and Nebraska ended controversially as the officiating crew added one second to the clock, allowing Texas to score the winning field goal over Nebraska.

Although most Nebraska fans disagreed with the call, former Nebraska coach Tom Osborne stated that Texas "won the game fair and square", and that he was at the game in the press box and felt confused when it first had happened.

Game results

See also  
 List of NCAA college football rivalry games

References

College football rivalries in the United States
Texas Longhorns football
Nebraska Cornhuskers football